3,5,5-Trimethyl-1-hexanol is a nine carbon primary alcohol, and it makes up the mixture isnononanol along with isononyl alcohol. It is used for fragrance in many toiletries and household cleaning products. Between one and ten metric tonnes are produced every year for use as a fragrance.

References 

Primary alcohols
Nonanols